Dot is an unincorporated community located in Logan County, Kentucky, United States.

The origin of the name "Dot" is obscure.

On February 24, 2018, the community was struck by an EF-2 Tornado. One person, an elderly woman, was killed. The tornado was part of a larger weather system that brought several other tornadoes to portions of Arkansas, Missouri, Ohio, and Tennessee, along with major flooding to portions of the Mississippi and Ohio Valleys.

References

Unincorporated communities in Logan County, Kentucky
Unincorporated communities in Kentucky